Psilocybe natalensis is a species of psilocybin mushroom in the family Hymenogastraceae. It is found in South Africa. The specific epithet refers to its type locality in Natal. The species was described as new to science in 1995 by Jochen Gartz, Derek Reid, Michael Smith, and Albert Eicker.   It is very closely related to Psilocybe cubensis, and differs in its habitat preference, less persistent annulus and genetic sequence.

See also
List of psilocybin mushrooms
List of Psilocybe species

References

External links

Psychoactive fungi
natalensis
Psychedelic tryptamine carriers
Fungi of Africa
Taxa named by Derek Reid
Fungi described in 1995